Tampines Regional Library (Chinese: 淡滨尼区域图书馆; Malay: Perpustakaan Wilayah Tampines) is a library located at Our Tampines Hub, Singapore. It is the first regional library in Singapore.

The library was opened in 1994 at Tampines New Town and was closed in June 2017 for upgrading. It was re-opened on 5 August 2017 at Our Tampines Hub.

History
It was first opened at Tampines Avenue 7 on 3 December 1994 by Senior Minister of State for Education and Health, Aline Wong.

The 6,208-square metre library was upgraded in 1998 to include better facilities. A Chinese library service was inaugurated in May 1998, after the signing of Understanding of Memorandum with the National Libraries of Beijing and Shanghai. The library also has conference and exhibition facilities. The library houses over 235,000 books with 63,000 books in Chinese, the largest collection of Chinese books in the library network. There is a vast collection of materials on overseas Chinese and children's books. The library also has a children's playhouse on the ground floor, IT and business books and microfilm services. It was temporarily closed on 4 June 2017 for upgrading.

It was reopened on 5 August that year at its new location, Our Tampines Hub at Level 2. The renovation increased floor space by 76 percent and seating capacity by 98 percent, while boosting the library's collection to over 400,000 books. New facilities included a culinary studio, 700m running track and indoor playground. Another addition was a branch of PIXEL Labs@NLB which allowed the public to utilise technology like 3D printers and hardware kits for free while creating a space for technology-related workshops and talks.

Transport links
Situated close to the Tampines MRT station and bus interchange, the library covers a floor area of 12,600 square metres.

Notes and references

External links
 National Library Board

Libraries established in 1994
Library buildings completed in 1994
Libraries in Singapore
Tampines
1994 establishments in Singapore
20th-century architecture in Singapore